Ajika or adjika, is a Georgian hot, spicy, but subtly flavored dip, often used to flavor food. In 2018, the technology of ajika was inscribed on the Intangible Cultural Heritage of Georgia list.

 
Common varieties of ajika resemble Italian red pesto in appearance and consistency. Though it is usually red, green ajika is also made with unripe peppers.

See also
 Erős Pista, a popular Hungarian pepper sauce.
 Biber salçası, a hot or sweet pepper paste in Turkish cuisine
 Muhammara or acuka, a hot pepper dip in Levantine cuisine
 Harissa, a hot chili pepper paste in Maghreb cuisine
 Zhug, a hot sauce in Middle Eastern cuisine, made from fresh hot peppers seasoned with coriander, garlic and various spices
 List of dips
 List of sauces

References

Herb and spice mixtures
Cuisine of Georgia (country)
Condiments